Lake Vermillion or Vermillion Lake may refer to:

Minnesota
Lake Vermilion, a lake in St. Louis County
Lake Vermilion State Park, a Minnesota state park, based around the lake of the same name
South Dakota
Lake Vermillion, a lake in McCook County

See also
Lake Vermilion (disambiguation)